Alexandru Cristea (1890–1942) was the composer of the music for "Limba Noastră", current national anthem of Moldova.

Biography
A choir director, a composer and music teacher. Taught at the  "Vasile Kormilov" music school (1928) with Gavriil Afanasiu and the  "Unirea" Conservatory (1927–1929) in Chişinău with Alexandru Antonovschi (canto), he was the master of vocal music from Chişinău (1920–1940), professor of music and conductor of the choir in the boys gymnasium "Ion Heliade Rădulescu" in București (1940–1941). Later, between 1941 and 1942, he directed the choir at the "Queen Mother Elena" high school from Chişinău. In 1920, he was ordained as a deacon of the St. George Church in Chişinău, from 1927 to 1941 was a deacon holds the Metropolitan Cathedral of Chişinău.

Creation
His main creation is considered the music for "Limba Noastră", current national anthem of Moldova, composed in the lyrics of the priest-poet Alexei Mateevici. He was awarded the “Răsplata muncii pentru biserică”.

References
  Alexandru Cristea (1890–1942) viața și activitatea reflectate în timp.  Biblioteca Municipală "B.P. Hasdeu" din Chișinău.

Moldovan composers
Male composers
1890 births
1942 deaths
Musicians from Chișinău
20th-century composers
National anthem writers